Ben Fritz Spencer Jr. (born March 28, 1995) is a retired American soccer player who played as a forward.

Club career

Youth
A native of New Mexico, Spencer joined Real Salt Lake's Grande Sports Academy ahead of the 2010-11 season. He left the RSL system for the 2011-12 season for the Chivas USA academy (although his MLS rights were retained by Real Salt Lake). Spencer committed to play college soccer for UC Santa Barbara for the fall 2013 season but instead agreed to join Molde in Norway in December 2012.

Professional
After several months of training, Spencer signed a professional deal with Molde in April 2013, shortly after turning 18. He made his professional debut in a 4–0 win over Vålerenga on September 1, 2013.

In March 2014 Spencer moved on a season-long loan to NASL side Indy Eleven, returning to Molde in November 2014 upon the completion of his loan deal.

He moved to Toronto FC II in 2015, on loan, however, he suffered an injury and was unable to appear in a match for the team.  After the season, Toronto FC acquired his MLS rights from Real Salt Lake. Soon after his loan ended, he joined Toronto FC II on a permanent transfer.
After spending 2016 and the beginning of 2017 with Toronto FC II in the United Soccer League, Spencer made the move up to Toronto FC on May 2, 2017. Spencer was a member of the treble winning Toronto FC team which won the Canadian Cup, Supporters' Shield, and MLS Cup during the 2017 season. He was released by the club in June 2018, after only making 5 appearances in 2 seasons, contributing 2 assists.

In 2019, he joined Phoenix Rising FC in the USL Championship.  He scored a penalty kick in the shootout of their 2019 US Open Cup Second Round loss. Spencer had the highest goals-per-minute ratio in the USL Championship during the 2019 season. During the season, he was loaned to USL League One affiliate FC Tucson. At the end of the season, he was not re-signed by the club.

Spencer joined San Diego Loyal SC in July 2020. 

On December 9, 2021, Spencer announced via his social media platforms his decision to retire from playing professional soccer.

International career
Spencer featured for the United States U18 in 2012, scoring three goals in six matches.

Career statistics

References

External links

1995 births
Living people
Soccer players from New Mexico
American soccer players
Molde FK players
Indy Eleven players
Toronto FC II players
Toronto FC players
Phoenix Rising FC players
FC Tucson players
San Diego Loyal SC players
Eliteserien players
North American Soccer League players
USL Championship players
American expatriate soccer players
Expatriate footballers in Norway
American expatriate sportspeople in Norway
Expatriate soccer players in Canada
United States men's youth international soccer players
United States men's under-20 international soccer players
United States men's under-23 international soccer players
2015 CONCACAF U-20 Championship players
Major League Soccer players
Association football forwards
USL League One players
Homegrown Players (MLS)